The Museum of Failure is a museum that features a collection of failed products and services. The touring exhibition provides visitors with a learning experience about the critical role of failure in innovation and encourages organizations to become better at learning from failure. Samuel West's 2016 visit to the Museum of Broken Relationships in Zagreb, Croatia, inspired the concept of the museum. Museum founder and curator Samuel West reportedly registered a domain name for the museum and later realized he had misspelled the word museum. The Swedish Innovation Authority (Vinnova) partially funded the museum. The exhibition opened on June 7, 2017, in Helsingborg, Sweden. The exhibit reopened at Dunkers Kulturhus on June 2, 2018, before closing in January 2019. A temporary exhibit opened in Los Angeles, California, in December 2017. The Los Angeles museum was on Hollywood Boulevard in the Hollywood & Highland Center. The exhibit opened in January - March 2019 at Shanghai, No.1 Center (上海第一百货).  And in December 2019 a smaller version opened in Paris, France at the Cité des Sciences et de l'Industrie along with other interesting failure-related exhibitions for the "Festival of Failures" (Les Foirés festival des flops, des bides, des ratés et des inutiles).

According to West, the goal of the museum is to help people recognize "we need to accept failure if we want progress", and to emphasize to companies to learn more from their failures without resorting to "cliches".

The growing collection consists of over 150 failed products and services worldwide. Every item provides insight into the risky business of innovation. Some examples of the items on display: Apple Newton, Bic for Her, Google Glass, N-Gage, lobotomy instruments, Harley-Davidson Cologne, Kodak DC-40, Sony Betamax, Lego Fiber Optics, the My Friend Cayla talking doll, and Paolo Macchiarini's infamous plastic trachea.

In May 2020, the museum made most of the collection of artifacts available for viewing on its website. As Covid-19 virus restrictions closed most museums around the globe, many have offered free virtual tours.

The museum has received international attention for its unusual collection.

References

Further reading
 Danner, J., & Coopersmith, M. (2015). The Other "F" Word: How Smart Leaders, Teams, and Entrepreneurs Put Failure to Work. John Wiley & Sons. 
 Cannon, M. D., & Edmondson, A. C. (2005). Failing to learn and learning to fail (intelligently): How great organizations put failure to work to innovate and improve. Long Range Planning, 38(3), 299–319.
 Khanna, R., Guler, I., & Nerkar, A. (2016). Fail often, fail big, and fail fast? Learning from small failures and R&D performance in the pharmaceutical industry. Academy of Management Journal, 59(2), 436–459.
What Google Learned From Its Quest to Build the Perfect Team, New York Times, 28 February 2016.
 Frazier, M. L., Fainshmidt, S., Klinger, R. L., Pezeshkan, A., & Vracheva, V. (2017). Psychological safety: A meta‐analytic review and extension. Personnel Psychology, 70(1), 113–165.
 Agarwal, P., & Farndale, E. (2017). High‐performance work systems and creativity implementation: the role of psychological capital and psychological safety. Human Resource Management Journal.
 West, S., & Shiu, E. C. C. (2014). Play as a facilitator of organizational creativity. Creativity research: An inter-disciplinary and multi-disciplinary research handbook (2014), 191–206.

2017 establishments in Europe
Museums established in 2017
Museums in Sweden
Technology museums
Helsingborg
Failure
Market failure
Technological failures
Innovation